Furio Meniconi (22 February 1924 – 12 December 1981) was an Italian film and television actor.

Life and career 
Meniconi was born in Rome into a family active in the cinema industry in the  technical cast, or engaged in the general organization. Since the early 1950s he  established himself as one of the most active character actors in the Italian genre cinema, especially in the Peplum, Spaghetti Western and pirate film genres. He was sometimes credited as Men Fury.

Selected filmography 

 Son of d'Artagnan (1950)
 Poppy (1952)
 Sardinian Vendetta (1952) - Primo fratello Leoni
 Patos e Papoulas (1953) - Spacciatore di droga
 Riscatto (1953)
 Attila (1954) - Capo della tribu
 Queen of Babylon (1954) - Bolgias
 La campana di San Giusto (1954)
 The Sign of Venus (1955) - Proprietario della trattoria
 Vous pigez? (1955) - Giuseppe
 Orlando e i Paladini di Francia (1956)
 Allow Me, Daddy! (1956) - Il secondo facchino
 Pirate of the Half Moon (1957) - Carceriere
 Adorabili e bugiarde (1958) - Gigetto
 Captain Falcon (1958)
 Goliath and the Barbarians (1959) - Hulderich
 Due selvaggi a corte (1959)
 Ben-Hur (1959) - Soldier (uncredited)
 David and Goliath (1960) - Asrod, King of the Philistines
 Carthage in Flames (1960)
 The Seven Revenges (1961) - Amok
 The Tartars (1961) - Sigrun
 The Giant of Metropolis (1961) - Egon - Father of Yota
 Vulcan Son of Jupiter (1962) - Jupiter - God of Lightning
 The Seven Tasks of Ali Baba (1962) - Mustapha
 Musketeers of the Sea (1962) - Pirate Captain
 The Avenger (1962) - Turno's Henchman (uncredited)
 Gold for the Caesars (1963) - Dax - the Gaul
 Cleopatra (1963) - Mithridates (uncredited)
 Terror of the Steppes (1964) - Kublai
 Hercules, Prisoner of Evil (1964) - Zereteli
 Desert Raiders (1964) - El Krim
 Hercules of the Desert (1964) - Manatha
 Bianco, rosso, giallo, rosa (1964) - Pillione
 Terror of the Steppes (1964)
 The Revenge of Ivanhoe (1965) - Etimbaldo
 The Agony and the Ecstasy (1965) - Peasant (uncredited)
 I predoni del Sahara (1965)
 James Tont operazione D.U.E. (1966)
 Un gangster venuto da Brooklyn (1966)
 For a Few Extra Dollars (1966) - Newman
 Kill or Be Killed (1966) - Jonathan Griffith
 Snow Devils (1967) - Igrun
 Wanted (1967) - Jeremiah Prescott, Blacksmith
 Kill the Wicked! (1967) - Braddock
 John the Bastard (1967) - Papa Buck
 Gunman Sent by God (1968) - Norton
 I'll Sell My Skin Dearly (1968) - Joe, Shane's Father (uncredited)
 The Longest Hunt (1968) - Dickson
 Gatling Gun (1968) - Jeremiah Grant
 Kill Them All and Come Back Alone (1968) - Buddy
 The Two Crusaders (1968) - 'Saladino'
 Time and Place for Killing (1968) - Rock Mulligan
 Tarzana, the Wild Girl (1969) - Lars
 Isabella, duchessa dei diavoli (1969) - Hans the Hitmen's Leader
 Zum zum zum n° 2 (1969) - Warden (uncredited)
 Django the Bastard (1969) - Sheriff Reagan (uncredited)
 And God Said to Cain (1970) - Mike
 A Sword for Brando (1970) - Tall friar
 Sartana's Here… Trade Your Pistol for a Coffin (1970) - Romero (uncredited)
 Adiós, Sabata (1970) - Murdock (uncredited)
 Uccidi Django... uccidi per primo!!! (1971)
 Bastard, Go and Kill (1971) - Don Felipe Antonio de Martinez
 The Scalawag Bunch (1971) - Innkeeper
 Guns for Dollars (1971) - Glock (uncredited)
 Tara Pokì (1971) - Senor Pokì
 Armiamoci e partite! (1971) - French Soldier
 They Call Him Cemetery (1971) - Saloon Patron (uncredited)
 W Django! (1971) - Lo sceriffo
 His Name Was Holy Ghost (1972)
 Man Called Amen (1972)  - Sheriff (uncredited)
 Deadly Trackers (1972) - Tom - Carter's Foreman
 Man of the East (1972) - Rancher on Train
 100 Fäuste und ein Vaterunser (1972) - Old man from Mountsville
 The Grand Duel (1972) - Hangman
 Those Dirty Dogs (1973) - Cantina Owner
 Even Angels Eat Beans (1973) - Wrestling Coach (uncredited)
 Man Called Invincible (1973) - Speedy Fingers
 Oremus, Alleluia e Così Sia (1973)
 Italian Graffiti (1973)
 Il bacio di una morta (1974) - Old Accomplice of Manuel
 Di Tresette ce n'è uno, tutti gli altri son nessuno (1974) - Doctor (uncredited)
 Ten Killers Came from Afar (1974) - (uncredited)
 Salvo D'Acquisto (1974) - Alvaro
 Deep Red (1975) - Rodi
 Go Gorilla Go (1975) - Old Man with Moustache (uncredited)
 A Genius, Two Partners and a Dupe (1975) - (uncredited)
 Hanno ucciso un altro bandito (1976) - (final film role)

References

External links  
 

 

1924 births 
1981 deaths 
20th-century Italian male actors
Italian male film actors
Italian male television actors 
Male actors from Rome
Male Spaghetti Western actors